Speak No Evil is a 1965 album by Wayne Shorter.

Speak No Evil may also refer to:

Film, television, and radio
Speak No Evil (2013 film), an American horror film
Speak No Evil (2022 film), a Danish psychological thriller film
"Speak No Evil" (Batman Beyond), a television episode
"Speak No Evil" (Haven), a television episode
Speak No Evil (play), a 1980 radio play by Juliet Ace
Speak No Evil, a 2005 BBC documentary discussing the 1988–1994 British broadcasting voice restrictions

Literature
Speak No Evil (Eberhart novel), a 1941 mystery by Mignon G. Eberhart
Speak No Evil, a novel by Graham Farrow
Speak No Evil (Iweala novel), a 2018 novel by Uzodinma Iweala

Music
Speak No Evil (Buddy Rich album), 1976
Speak No Evil (Flora Purim album), 2003
Speak No Evil (Tinsley Ellis album), 2009
Speak No Evil, an album by Pinmonkey, 2002
"Speak No Evil" (song), by Dragon, 1985

See also
See no evil, hear no evil, speak no evil